Kenwood is a census-designated place (CDP) in Sycamore Township, Hamilton County, Ohio, United States. The population was 7,570 at the 2020 census. It is a major shopping destination for the Cincinnati area, featuring properties such as Kenwood Towne Centre and The Kenwood Collection.

Geography
Kenwood is located at  (39.205912, -84.375745).

Demographics

At the 2000 census there were 7,423 people, 3,305 households, and 1,953 families in the CDP. The population density was 3,182.3 people per square mile (1,230.1/km). There were 3,478 housing units at an average density of 1,491.0/sq mi (576.3/km).  The racial makeup of the CDP was 89.14% White, 5.11% African American, 0.09% Native American, 4.76% Asian, 0.34% from other races, and 0.57% from two or more races. Hispanic or Latino of any race were 1.76%.

Of the 3,305 households 25.9% had children under the age of 18 living with them, 49.7% were married couples living together, 7.4% had a female householder with no husband present, and 40.9% were non-families. 38.3% of households were one person and 23.0% were one person aged 65 or older. The average household size was 2.18 and the average family size was 2.93.

The age distribution was 22.0% under the age of 18, 4.4% from 18 to 24, 23.1% from 25 to 44, 22.3% from 45 to 64, and 28.2% 65 or older. The median age was 45 years. For every 100 females, there were 79.3 males. For every 100 females age 18 and over, there were 74.1 males.

The median household income was $53,300 and the median family income  was $74,511. Males had a median income of $55,699 versus $35,885 for females. The per capita income for the CDP was $32,458. About 1.6% of families and 3.3% of the population were below the poverty line, including 1.4% of those under age 18 and 4.9% of those age 65 or over.

References

Census-designated places in Hamilton County, Ohio
Census-designated places in Ohio